Linha Aérea Transcontinental Brasileira S.A. was a Brazilian airline formed in 1944 and that started scheduled flights in 1946. In 1951 it was sold to Real Transportes Aéreos, which incorporated the airline the following year.

History
Linha Aérea Transcontinental Brasileira was formed on July 22, 1944 with a fleet of five Avro Ansons. Some experimental flights were made in 1945 but only on February 1, 1946 scheduled flights began.

In October 1948 Transcontinental started and operational agreement with VASD, being the first case of an operational agreement between Brazilian airlines. In 1949 a third route was created, between Rio de Janeiro and Fortaleza.

In 1951 Transcontinental was sold to and incorporated by Real Transportes Aéreos.

Destinations
In 1948 Transcontinental was flying between Rio de Janeiro and São Paulo, and Rio de Janeiro and Recife via the coast. In 1949 a third route was created, between Rio de Janeiro and Fortaleza.

Fleet

Accidents and incidents
6 June 1951: a Douglas DC-3 D registration PP-NAL struck high ground while flying below minimums during approach to Rio de Janeiro. One crew member and one passenger died.

See also
List of defunct airlines of Brazil

References

External links
Transcontinental Accidents as per Aviation Safety Database

Defunct airlines of Brazil
Airlines established in 1944
Airlines disestablished in 1951
1944 establishments in Brazil
1951 disestablishments in Brazil
1951 mergers and acquisitions